María Cristina Betancourt Ramírez (born 15 December 1947) is a retired Cuban discus thrower, born in Havana. Her personal best throw was 66.54 metres, achieved in February 1981 in Havana.

In 1983 she was tested positively for doping during the Pan American Games and subsequently received a lifetime ban.

Achievements

References

1947 births
Athletes from Havana
Cuban female discus throwers
Athletes (track and field) at the 1976 Summer Olympics
Athletes (track and field) at the 1980 Summer Olympics
Athletes (track and field) at the 1971 Pan American Games
Athletes (track and field) at the 1975 Pan American Games
Athletes (track and field) at the 1979 Pan American Games
Athletes (track and field) at the 1983 Pan American Games
Olympic athletes of Cuba
Doping cases in athletics
Living people
Pan American Games medalists in athletics (track and field)
Pan American Games silver medalists for Cuba
Central American and Caribbean Games gold medalists for Cuba
Competitors at the 1970 Central American and Caribbean Games
Competitors at the 1974 Central American and Caribbean Games
Competitors at the 1978 Central American and Caribbean Games
Competitors at the 1982 Central American and Caribbean Games
Central American and Caribbean Games medalists in athletics
Medalists at the 1971 Pan American Games
Medalists at the 1975 Pan American Games
Medalists at the 1979 Pan American Games
Sportspeople banned for life
20th-century Cuban women
20th-century Cuban people